This is a list of Dutch television related events from 1983.

Events
23 February - Bernadette is selected to represent Netherlands at the 1983 Eurovision Song Contest with her song "Sing Me a Song". She is selected to be the twenty-eighth Dutch Eurovision entry during Nationaal Songfestival held at Congresgebouw in The Hague.

Debuts
2 November –  Postman Pat

Television shows

1950s
NOS Journaal (1956–present)

1970s
Sesamstraat (1976–present)

1980s
Jeugdjournaal (1981–present)

Ending this year

Births
18 January - Emiel Sandtke, actor
15 November - Vivienne van den Assem, actress & TV presenter

Deaths